Richard Papillon (born 27 May 1992), better known as shox, is a French professional Counter-Strike: Global Offensive player for Apeks. He is considered one of the greatest players in Global Offensive history, known for his high skill and longevity in the scene, and featured in HLTV's Top 20 Players list from 2013 to 2016. He has won over a dozen international tournaments, as well as one Major Championship: DreamHack Winter 2014.

Early life
Shox began playing Counter-Strike when he was nine years old, and was introduced to the series by his older brother. His parents allowed him to take a year off from studies to pursue the game which led to him joining his first successful teams in Counter-Strike: Source around 2007. His handle referenced a model of Nike shoes that were popular at the time.

Career
Shox is best known for playing for a number of French Counter-Strike teams, including VeryGames, Titan, Team LDLC, EnVyUs, G2, and Team Vitality. Shox began playing competitive Counter-Strike in 2006 but made his name in Counter-Strike: Source with French squads that dominated the game. Shox was a part of the VeryGames team that won ESWC 2011, his first Major. He rejoined VeryGames after Counter-Strike: Global Offensive was released, becoming the best player in the world in late 2013 and early 2014.

In 2021 he joined a non-French team, signing with Team Liquid, for the first time. Just six months later, he was moved to the bench after disappointing results. He then signed with a Norwegian organization, Apeks, in August 2022.

References

1992 births
Team Envy players
Team LDLC.com players
G2 Esports players
Team Vitality players
French esports players
Living people
Counter-Strike players